Torrance County is a county located in the center of the U.S. state of New Mexico. As of the 2010 census, the population was 16,383. The county seat is Estancia.

The geographic center of New Mexico is located in Torrance County, southwest of the Village of Willard, and in 2010, the center of population of New Mexico was located in Torrance County, near Manzano.  Torrance County is included in the Albuquerque, NM Metropolitan Statistical Area.

Geography
Most of the county is gently rolling grassland ranging from 6000 to 6200 feet in elevation. The Manzano Mountains rising to 10,098 feet on the western edge of the county provide it with its only significant topographic relief. The Manzano Wilderness area includes the highest part of the mountains. The other notable geographic feature of the county is the series of playas and seasonal lakes centering on Laguna del Perro southeast of Estancia.

Adjacent counties
 Santa Fe County - north
 San Miguel County - north
 Guadalupe County - east
 Lincoln County - south
 Socorro County - south
 Valencia County - west
 Bernalillo County - northwest

National protected areas
 Cibola National Forest (part)
 Salinas Pueblo Missions National Monument (part)

Government

County Commissioners
 District 1:  Kevin McCall (2019 - 2022)
 District 2:  Ryan Schwebach (2019 - 2022)
 District 3:  LeRoy M. Candelaria (2021 - 2024)
 County Manager - Janice Y. Barela 
 County Clerk - Yvonne Otero (2021 - 2024)
 County Treasurer - Tracy L. Sedillo (2021 - 2024)
 County Assessor - Jesse Lucero (2019 - 2022) 
 County Sheriff - Martin Rivera (2019 - 2022) 
 County Probate Judge - Josie Chavez (2019 - 2022)

Demographics

2000 census
As of the 2000 census, there were 16,911 people, 6,024 households, and 4,391 families residing in the county. The racial makeup of the county was 43.89% White, 31.66% Black or African American, 2.09% Native American, 0.32% Asian, 0.13% Pacific Islander, 17.95% from other races, and 3.97% from two or more races. 37.15% of the population were Hispanic or Latino of any race.

There were 6,024 households, out of which 37.80% had children under the age of 18 living with them, 55.40% were married couples living together, 12.30% had a female householder with no husband present, and 27.10% were non-families. 23.20% of all households were made up of individuals, and 7.90% had someone living alone who was 65 years of age or older. The average household size was 2.72 and the average family size was 3.20.

In the county, the population was spread out, with 30.40% under the age of 18, 7.50% from 18 to 24, 29.20% from 25 to 44, 23.20% from 45 to 64, and 9.70% who were 65 years of age or older. The median age was 35 years. For every 100 females there were 105.50 males. For every 100 females age 18 and over, there were 106.20 males.

The median income for a household in the county was $30,446, and the median income for a family was $34,461. Males had a median income of $29,403 versus $21,833 for females. The per capita income for the county was $14,134. About 15.20% of families and 19.00% of the population were below the poverty line, including 24.50% of those under age 18 and 12.00% of those age 65 or over.

2010 census
As of the 2010 census, there were 16,383 people, 6,264 households, and 4,192 families residing in the county. The racial makeup of the county was 36.1% white, 2.3% American Indian, 41.3% black or African American, 0.4% Asian, 15.5% from other races, and 4.3% from two or more races. Those of Hispanic or Latino origin made up 39.1% of the population. In terms of ancestry, 17.5% were German, 12.2% were Irish, 10.0% were English, and 2.3% were American.

Of the 6,264 households, 31.8% had children under the age of 18 living with them, 48.5% were married couples living together, 12.0% had a female householder with no husband present, 33.1% were non-families, and 27.6% of all households were made up of individuals. The average household size was 2.52 and the average family size was 3.06. The median age was 41.6 years.

The median income for a household in the county was $37,117 and the median income for a family was $43,914. Males had a median income of $37,545 versus $28,826 for females. The per capita income for the county was $17,278. About 13.5% of families and 19.4% of the population were below the poverty line, including 30.7% of those under age 18 and 11.5% of those age 65 or over.

Communities

City
 Moriarty

Towns
 Estancia (county seat)
 Mountainair

Villages
 Encino
 Willard

Census-designated places
 Deer Canyon
 Duran
 Indian Hills
 Manzano
 Manzano Springs (partial)
 McIntosh
 Punta de Agua
 Tajique
 Torreon

Unincorporated communities
 Abo
 Cedarvale
 Clines Corners
 Progresso
 Wagon Wheel

Education
School districts include:
 Corona Municipal Schools
 Estancia Municipal Schools
 Moriarty Municipal Schools
 Mountainair Public Schools
 Vaughn Municipal Schools

See also
 National Register of Historic Places listings in Torrance County, New Mexico
 USS Torrance (AKA-76), a U.S. Navy ship named after the county

References

 
1903 establishments in New Mexico Territory
Albuquerque metropolitan area